Orient Thai Airlines Co., Ltd. was a Thai airline with its head office in Khlong Toei, Bangkok. It operated charter and scheduled services in Southeast Asia and was based at Don Mueang International Airport. On October 9, 2018, the airline ceased all operations.

History
Orient Thai Airlines and its now-defunct wholly owned domestic carrier One-Two-GO Airlines are the only Thai airlines to bear a royal seal, made possible by the owner's, Udom Tantiprasonchai, close relationship with the King of Thailand, based on Mr. Tantiprasongchai's history of breaking traditional commercial barriers for Thailand. Prior to their current location, Orient Thai and its subsidiary One-Two-GO were headquartered in Don Mueang District, Bangkok.

On 22 July 2008, shortly after the crash of One-Two-GO Airlines Flight 269 in Phuket which killed 89 people, and after the Internet publication of illegally excessive work hours and check ride fraud, Orient Thai and One-Two-GO were ordered to suspend service for 56 days. 

On 22 September 2010, Orient Thai took delivery of its first Boeing 747-400 aircraft, previously registered as N548MD, and arrived at the Orient Thai base as HS-STC. In November 2015, Orient Thai Airways signed a contract with the Amadeus IT Group to be listed in Global Distribution Systems for the first time.

In early May 2016, the airline was sanctioned for the second time within a few weeks by the Civil Aviation Administration of China after violating regulations. In September 2017, Orient Thai Airlines temporarily suspended all operations. In December 2017, it resumed services after completing re-certification with the Thai aviation authorities.

By end of July 2018, Orient Thai Airlines suspended all operations and entered a restructuring process. The airline later ceased operations and filed for bankruptcy in October 2018. On 5 January 2021, Royal Gazette published an announcement declaring Orient Thai Airlines bankrupt and ordering the Legal Execution Department to seize its remaining assets to pay its debtors and the founder of the airline dies 2 weeks later at age 66.

Destinations
As of November 2017, Orient Thai Airlines served the following scheduled destinations:

Thailand
Bangkok – Don Mueang International Airport base

People's Republic of China
Changsha – Changsha Huanghua International Airport
Nanchang – Nanchang Changbei International Airport
Shanghai – Shanghai Pudong International Airport

Australia 
Brisbane - Brisbane International Airport

Fleet

Final fleet

Before the airline suspended all operations, the Orient Thai Airlines fleet consisted of the following aircraft:

Retired aircraft

During its history, Orient Thai Airlines operated a wide range of pre-owned aircraft including most variants of the Boeing 747:

Incidents and accidents
 In September 2004, an Orient Thai 747 mistakenly flew within 200 meters of Japan's Tokyo Tower over the heart of downtown Tokyo.

 On 31 July 2013, a chartered Orient Thai 737-400 operating as OX833 made an emergency landing at Surat Thani airport, carrying Chinese passengers from Shenzhen to Phuket. None of the 130 passengers and nine crew was injured.

References

External links

Official website

Defunct airlines of Thailand
Airlines established in 1995
Airlines disestablished in 2018
2018 disestablishments in Thailand
Companies based in Bangkok
Thai companies established in 1995